For lists of encyclopedias, see:

 List of encyclopedias by branch of knowledge
 List of encyclopedias by date
 List of encyclopedias by language
 List of online encyclopedias

See also
 Bibliography of encyclopedias
 List of almanacs
 Lists of dictionaries
 List of digital library projects
 Cyclopedia (disambiguation)

 
Lists of reference books